Yiadom  is a Ghanaian surname. Notable people with this name include:

Andy Yiadom (born 1991), English-born Ghanaian footballer
Charles Konadu-Yiadom (born 1968), Ghanaian politician
Isaac Yiadom (born 1996), American football cornerback
Kenneth Amponsah-Yiadom, Ghanaian politician
Nana Konadu Yiadom III, Queen Mother of the Ashanti Kingdom

See also 
 Boakye-Yiadom

Ghanaian surnames